Nürtingen is a town on the river Neckar in the district of Esslingen in the state of Baden-Württemberg in southern Germany.

History

The following events occurred, by year:

1046: First mention of Niuritingin in the document of Speyer. Heinrich III gave Nürtingen as a gift to the chapter of Speyer
around 1335: Nürtingen received city rights
1421: From this date, Nürtingen was the domicile of the Württemberg widows of former sovereigns.
1602: The Maientag, a famous folklore procession and celebration, was first recorded
1634: Half of the population died in the Thirty Years' War and of the plague
1750: 133 buildings were burned down in the great fire
1783/1784: Friedrich Hölderlin and Friedrich Wilhelm Joseph von Schelling were pupils of the Latin school (German: Lateinschule). They are still commemorated in the town by the street name Schellingstraße and the name of a high school Hölderlin-Gymnasium.

20th century
During the Nazi era there were in today's urban area 17 forced labor camps and accommodations with "Eastern workers", prisoners of war and "foreign workers", who had to work in the local companies, such as Maschinenfabrik Gebrüder Heller. At the present location of the secondary schools was the Mühlwiesenlager with "Eastern workers". Eleven names of victims of the "euthanasia" murders are known; they were killed in Grafeneck or Hadamar.  They also caused that all in so-called "mixed marriages" living men were brought to concentration camps and murdered there.

A Sinti child born in Nürtingen, Anton Köhler, was with most of his siblings brought in 1944 from the Catholic orphanage St. Josephpflege in Mulfingen to Auschwitz-Birkenau and killed after his parents had been murdered.

1945 : A few bombs hit Nürtingen. The Tiefenbachtal (a valley south of Nürtingen) was an escape route for German soldiers.
1948 : The population increased from 10,000 to 17,000 due to refugees and displaced persons from East Germany
1973 : The district of Nürtingen was merged into the district of Esslingen

Education
Nürtingen is home to Nürtingen-Geislingen University of Applied Science, also known as the Hochschule für Wirtschaft und Umwelt Nürtingen-Geislingen. The school hosts undergraduate and graduate programs in business administration, finance, real estate, and landscape architecture. Programs are taught in English and German, with a Master of Science in International Finance being taught through its growing European School of Finance, which partners with the German Institute for Corporate Finance, the European Derivatives Institute, the Deutsche Börse, and the Eurex exchange.

Mayors since 1819
 1819–1828: Gottlob Friedrich Schickhardt
 1828–1846: Heinrich Schickhardt
 1846–1868: Karl Friedrich Eßig
 1868–1896: Ferdinand Wilhelm Schmid (1829–1896)
 1896–1930: Matthäus Baur
 1930–1939: Hermann Weilenmann
 1939–1943: Walter Klemm (NSDAP)
 1943–1945: August Pfänder, temporary (NSDAP) (1891–1971)
 1945–1948: Hermann Weilenmann
 1948–1959: August Pfänder
 1959–1979: Karl Gonser (1914–1991)
 1979–2004: Alfred Bachofer (Free Voters) (born 1942)
 since 2004: Otmar Heirich (SPD) (born 1951)

Districts

Hardt
Hardt (929 inhabitants, as of 2012) is the smallest district of Nürtingen. Hardt was first mentioned in 1366 in documents.

Neckarhausen
Neckarhausen (3,768 inhabitants, as of 2012) is about 2 km from Nürtingen. Neckarhausen was first mentioned in the year 1284. The site is largely dominated by the church and the town hall.

Raidwangen
Raidwangen (2,115 inhabitants, as of 2014) is about 3 km southwest of Nürtingen and about 1 km from the Neckar. Raidwangen was first mentioned in 1236 in documents.

Reudern
Reudern (2,707 inhabitants, as of 2012) is located on a hill approximately 3 km east of Nürtingen and was first mentioned in the year 1338.

Zizishausen
Zizishausen (3,222 inhabitants, as of 2012) is to the left and right of the Neckar and borders to the north directly to the core city of Nürtingen. Zizishausen was first mentioned in 1296.

Oberensingen
Oberensingen (4,060 inhabitants, 2006) closes immediately northwest of the central city of Nürtingen. The first mention dates back to 1344.

Roßdorf
Roßdorf lies south of Nürtingen. The district was created in the early 1960s as a model construction project for modern urban planning on the drawing board. Today Roßdorf has around 4,500 inhabitants.

Local council
The local council in Nürtingen has 32 members. Until 2014, the local council had 39 members. The Baden-Württemberg elections in 2014 had the following results. The Oberbürgermeister (Mayor) is the president of the council and has one vote.

Twin towns - sister cities
Nürtingen is twinned with:
 Oullins, France
 Rhondda Cynon Taf, Wales, United Kingdom
 Soroksár (Budapest), Hungary
 Zerbst, Germany

Notable people

Christian Friedrich Duttenhofer (1742–1814), theologian
Gottlieb Jakob Planck (1751–1833), theologian and church historian, great-grandfather of Max Planck
Albert Schäffle (1831–1903), scientist and statesman
Robert Wiedersheim (1848–1923), physician
Herbert Maisch (1890–1974), theatre director, stage and film director
Gotthilf Kurz (1923–2010), bookbinder, book artist and graphic artist
Erwin Waldner (1933–2015), footballer
Bernd Hoss (1939–2016), football manager
Klaus Just (born 1964), sprinter
Alois Schwartz (born 1967), football player and manager
Markus P. Peters (born 1972), inventor, entrepreneur
Thomas Brdaric (born 1975), footballer
Wolf Henzler (born 1975), race car driver
Christian Gentner (born 1985), footballer
Dominic Maroh (born 1987), Slovenian footballer
Matthias Jaissle (born 1988), footballer
Thomas Gentner (born 1988), footballer
Daniel Didavi (born 1990), footballer
Pascal Breier (born 1992), footballer

References

External links

 
Official Website of University (German & English)

Towns in Baden-Württemberg
Esslingen (district)
Populated places on the Neckar basin
Populated riverside places in Germany
Württemberg